Lotte Hass (born Charlotte Hildegard Baierl; 6 November 1928 – 14 January 2015 (age 86)) was an Austrian underwater diver, model and actress. She was the second wife of the Austrian naturalist and diving pioneer Hans Hass (1919–2013), and worked as a model and actress in several of his underwater natural history films. She was inducted into the Women Divers Hall of Fame and the International Scuba Diving Hall of Fame in 2000.

Life and work

When Hans Hass was looking for a secretary for his office in Vienna in the summer of 1947, Lotte Baierl took the position. She had just passed her high school exam and was a big fan of Hass. Lotte got to work next to his office to deal with diving equipment and underwater cameras, because she hoped to be allowed to attend Hass's next expedition. She trained in swimming pools, dived and photographed in the lakes around Vienna, and was supported and trained by Hass's assistant Kurt Schaefer.

Hans Hass was generally opposed to a woman participating in his expeditions. Lotte, who learned not only to dive but to handle competently an underwater camera, asked repeatedly to be included in his expeditions. Hass finally relented when the film company Sascha Wiener insisted that Hass's next documentary would be made more attractive to a wider audience by a pretty female lead.

They chose Lotte Baierl. The multi-month expedition to the Red Sea in 1950 was difficult, but led to the Oscar-winning film "Under the Red Sea", in which she starred under her maiden name. Hass was the first to film manta rays and whale sharks. Lotte was active there as an underwater photographer and underwater model. To the delight of the audience, she wore a revealing swimming costume. In 1970, she published her experiences during the expedition to the Red Sea in her book "A Girl on the Ocean Floor".

Lotte proved to be a photogenic talent. The press were eager for interviews and photos of the sympathetic natural girl with long blond hair who was not afraid of danger and work underwater. Soon she was seen on the front pages of leading international magazines and pages of reports. She received film offers from Hollywood, but she refused them all because she did not want to be a full-time actress. Lotte also arrived in the United States, joined their participation in the expedition to the Red Sea in Germany and Austria, but also was criticised, because they doubted the scientific seriousness of Hans Hass. The "Hessian messages" described the expedition to the Red Sea as a "pin-up expedition" because of Lotte's participation. Others mockingly titled Lotte Baierl as "Lotte Haierl" ("Hai" is German for "shark").

As late as 1959 the German news magazine Der Spiegel sneered in a television criticism: "No cave without Lotte". They did not understand what a balancing act Hass had to make for the commercialisation of his films: they were produced in the form of documentaries, but reworked and presented to the audience as feature films. This combination worked surprisingly well: at the 1951 Venice Biennale the film "Adventures in the Red Sea" was awarded the international prize for feature-length documentaries.

In early November 1950, on the return flight from Port Sudan to Vienna, Hans Hass and Lotte Baierl became engaged. Hass's marriage with his first wife, actress Hannelore Schroth, had ended in divorce in April 1950. 

The civil wedding of Hans and Lotte Hass was held on 29 November 1950 in Küsnacht on Lake Zurich. The church wedding took place in February 1963 in St. Augustin Church in Vienna.

In the 1950s, Lotte took part in two "Xarifa" expeditions of Hans Hass. She and Hans hosted two British television series, Diving to Adventure and The Undersea World of Adventure. After the birth of their daughter, Meta, in 1958, Lotte Hass retired from public life and devoted herself to mainly household and education. They rarely returned before the camera. In 1976, she played a supporting role in Episode 29 "The Man from Portofino" of the famous detective series Derrick.

References

External links
 Williamson, Marcus.Obituary, Independent.co.uk; accessed 14 January 2016.  
 
 Article about Lotte Hass with a pdf-file in english, hans-hass.de; accessed 14 January 2016.

1928 births
2015 deaths
Austrian female models
Austrian underwater divers
People from Brigittenau
Models from Vienna